Rivas may refer to:

Places 
 Rivas, Pérez Zeledón, a district in Costa Rica, and an archaeological site.
 Rivas-Vaciamadrid, a municipality in Madrid, Spain.
 Rivas, Loire, a commune in France.
 Rivas Department, Nicaragua
 Rivas, Nicaragua, a city and municipality, capital of the department
 Rivas Peaks, Antarctica.

People
Rivas (surname)

Battles 
First Battle of Rivas (June 29, 1855), between the Nicaraguan army and rebel forces under William Walker
Second Battle of Rivas (April 11, 1856), between the Costa Rican militia under General Mora and the Nicaraguan forces of William Walker

See also
Riva (disambiguation)